Glasco Downtown Historic District is an early commercial, Italianate historic shopping area located in Glasco, Kansas that is listed on the National Register of Historic Places.  The  historic district runs roughly along Main Street from Railroad Avenue to Fisher Street and continues along Railroad Avenue and Fisher Streets between Main and Buffalo Streets in Glasco.  It includes 22 buildings deemed to contribute to the historic character of the area, one other contributing structure, and six non-contributing buildings.

It was listed on the National Register of Historic Places in 2002.

See also
 National Register of Historic Places listings in Cloud County, Kansas

References

Italianate architecture in Kansas
Geography of Cloud County, Kansas
Tourist attractions in Cloud County, Kansas
Historic districts on the National Register of Historic Places in Kansas
National Register of Historic Places in Cloud County, Kansas